Apostol Milev Karamitev (1923–1973) was a Bulgarian actor, popular throughout the 1960s. He finished acting under the guidance of B. Danovski. Later he specialized in Moscow, Leningrad, Prague and Warsaw. His debut was in the movie "Utro nad rodinata" (Dawn over the Fatherland) in 1951. Arguably his most famous role was that of the twin-brothers Radosvet and Radostin in the black and white classic Lyubimetz 13 (Favourite number 13). He died before finishing his last film, "Svatbite na Yoan Asen" (The marriages of Yoan Asen), and Kosta Tsonev had to take over his role.

Full filmography

Svatbite na Yoan Asen (1975), as Yoan Asen
Edin Snimachen Den (1969), as Aktyorat
Svoboda Ili Smart (1969), as David Todorov
 (1968), as Colonel Damyanov
Byalata Staya (1968), as Petar Aleksandrov
Ritzar bez Bronya (1966), as Vuychoto na Vanyo
Spetzialist po Vsichko(1962), as Apostol
Dvama pod Nebeto (1962), as Stefo
Noshtta Sreshtu 13-i (1961), as Todor Primov/Petar Primov
Három Csillag (1960), as Mihail
Patyat Minava prez Belovir (1960), as Inzhener Stamen Petrov
Lyubimetz 13 (1958), as Radoslav/Radosvet
Haydushka Kletva (1958), as Strahil
Legenda za Lyubovta (1957), as Ferhad
Legenda o Lásce (1957), as Ferchad
Tova se Sluchi na Ulitzata (1956), as Misho
Geroite na Shipka (1955), as Petka
Pesen za Choveka (1954), as Budinov
Nasha Zemya (1952), as Kapitan Velkov
Pod Igoto (1952), as Dyakon Vikenti
Utro nad Rodinata (1951), as Velizarov

References

External links 

1923 births
1973 deaths
Actors from Burgas
Bulgarian male film actors
Bulgarian male stage actors
20th-century Bulgarian male actors